Prüm, sometimes spelled Pruem, may mean one of the following:

Places
 Prüm, a town in Rhineland-Palatinate, Germany
 Prüm (Verbandsgemeinde), an administrative district around Prüm
 Prüm (river), a river in Rhineland-Palatinate, Germany
 Abbey of Prüm, a former abbey near the town of Prüm

People
 Pierre Prüm, the 14th Prime Minister of Luxembourg
 Emile Prüm, a Luxembourgian politician and father of Pierre Prüm
 Regino of Prüm, a Benedictine monk and chronicler at the Abbey of Prüm

Other
 The Prüm Convention, a security information-sharing agreement signed by several EU member states at Prüm, Germany
 Weingut Joh. Jos. Prüm a wine estate in the Mosel wine region of Germany.